The men's high jump event at the 1993 Summer Universiade was held at the UB Stadium in Buffalo, United States on 16 and 17 July.

Medalists

Results

Qualification

Final

1All athletes from Yugoslavia entered the games as "Independent Participants" due to United Nations sanctions against the country.

References

Athletics at the 1993 Summer Universiade
1993